Over the years 1825–1849, Frédéric Chopin wrote at least 59 compositions for piano called Mazurkas. Mazurka refers to one of the traditional Polish dances.
 58 have been published
 45 during Chopin's lifetime, of which 41 have opus numbers (with the remaining four works being two early mazurkas from 1826 and the famous "Notre Temps" and "Émile Gaillard" mazurkas that were published individually in 1841)
 13 posthumously, of which 8 have posthumous opus numbers (specifically, Opp. 67 & 68)
 11 further mazurkas are known whose manuscripts are either in private hands (2) or untraced (at least 9).

The serial numbering of the 58 published mazurkas normally goes only up to 51.  The remaining 7 are referred to by their key or catalogue number.

Chopin's composition of these mazurkas signaled new ideas of nationalism.

Origins

Chopin based his mazurkas on the traditional Polish folk dance, also called the mazurka (or "mazur" in Polish). However, while he used the traditional mazurka as his model, he was able to transform his mazurkas into an entirely new genre, one that became known as a "Chopin genre".

Compositions

Chopin started composing his mazurkas in 1825, and continued composing them until 1849, the year of his death.  The number of mazurkas composed in each year varies, but he was steadily writing them throughout this time period.

Musical style
Since Chopin's mazurkas connect to the already established traditional Polish mazurka, some of the characteristics of the genre remain the same in his interpretation.  For example, both the traditional mazurka and Chopin's version contain a great deal of repetition.  This can mean repetition of a single measure or small group of measures, repetition of a theme, or even repetition of an entire section.  This repetition makes sense in the traditional dance for the repeat of a certain section of the actual dance; even though Chopin did not compose his mazurkas so they could be danced to, it is clear Chopin kept the original form in mind.  Furthermore, many of the rhythmic patterns of the traditional mazurka also appear in Chopin's compositions so they still convey the idea of a dance, but a more "self-contained, stylized dance piece."  In keeping with this idea, Chopin did try to make his mazurkas more technically interesting by furthering their chromaticism and harmony, along with using classical techniques, such as counterpoint and fugues.  In fact, Chopin used more classical techniques in his mazurkas than in any of his other genres.  One of these techniques is four part harmony in the manner of a chorale.

Influences
While it is known that Chopin's mazurkas are connected to the traditional dance, throughout the years there has been much scholarly debate as to how exactly they are connected.  The main subject of this debate is whether Chopin had an actual direct connection to Polish folk music, or whether he heard Polish national music in urban areas and was inspired by that to compose his mazurkas.

In 1852, three years after Chopin's death, Franz Liszt published a piece about Chopin's mazurkas, saying that Chopin had been directly influenced by Polish national music to compose his mazurkas.  Liszt also provided descriptions of specific dance scenes, which were not completely accurate, but were "a way to raise the status of these works [mazurkas]."  While Liszt's claim was inaccurate, the actions of scholars who read his writing proved to be more disastrous.  When reading Liszt's work, scholars interpreted the word "national" as "folk," creating the "longest standing myth in Chopin criticism—the myth that Chopin's mazurkas are national works rooted in an authentic Polish-folk music tradition."  In fact, the most likely explanation for Chopin's influence is the national music he was hearing as a young man in urban areas of Poland, such as Warsaw.

After scholars created this myth, they furthered it through their own writings in different ways.  Some picked specific mazurkas that they could apply to a point they were trying to make in support of Chopin's direct connection with folk music.  Others simply made generalizations so that their claims of this connection would make sense.  In all cases, since these writers were well-respected and carried weight in the scholarly community, people accepted their suggestions as truth, which allowed the myth to grow.  However, in 1921, Béla Bartók published an essay in which he said that Chopin "had not known authentic Polish folk music." By the time of his death in 1945, Bartók was a very well known and respected composer, as well as a prominent expert on folk music, so his opinion and his writing carried a great deal of weight. Bartók suggested that Chopin instead had been influenced by national, and not folk music.

Arrangements

The soprano and composer Pauline Viardot was a close friend of Chopin and his lover George Sand, and she made a number of arrangements of his mazurkas as songs, with his full agreement.  He gave Viardot expert advice on these arrangements, as well as on her piano playing and her other vocal compositions. Chopin in turn derived from her some firsthand knowledge about Spanish music.

Several arrangements were made for piano and cello by Auguste Franchomme, a friend of Chopin who collaborated with him to compose Grand Duo concertant, and was also the dedicatee of his Cello Sonata.

The violinist Fritz Kreisler arranged the Mazurka No. 45 in A-minor, opus 67, for violin and piano.

List of mazurkas

Notes

Sources

Downes, Stephen (2009). "Mazurka." Grove Music Online. Oxford Music Online. 17 November 2009.  
Michałowski, Kornel and Samson, Jim (2009). "Chopin, Fryderyk Franciszek." Grove Music Online. Oxford Music Online. 17 November 2009 (esp. section 6, “Formative Influences”) .
Kallberg, Jeffrey (1988).  “The problem of repetition and return in Chopin's mazurkas.”  Chopin Styles, ed. Jim Samson.  Cambridge, England: Cambridge University Press
Kallberg, Jeffrey (1985). "Chopin's Last Style." Journal of the American Musicological Society 38.2: 264–315.
Milewski, Barbara (1999). "Chopin's Mazurkas and the Myth of the Folk." 19th-Century Music 23.2: 113–35.
Rosen, Charles (1995).  The Romantic Generation. Cambridge, Massachusetts: Harvard University Press
Winoker, Roselyn M. (1974)  “Chopin and the Mazurka.”  Diss. Sarah Lawrence College

 
Music with dedications